Electric blue is a color whose definition varies but is often considered close to cyan, and which is a representation of the color of lightning, an electric spark, and the color of ionized argon gas; it was originally named after the ionized air glow produced during electrical discharges, though its meaning has broadened to include shades of blue that are metaphorically "electric" by virtue of being "intense" or particularly "vibrant". Electric arcs can cause a variety of color emissions depending on the gases involved, but blue and purple are typical colors produced in the troposphere where oxygen and nitrogen dominate.

The first recorded use of electric blue as a color name in English was in 1845. The color electric blue (the version shown below as medium electric blue) was in vogue in the 1890s.

Variations of electric blue

Deep electric blue (French electric blue)

The deep tone of electric blue displayed at right is the color called bleu électrique in the Pourpre.com color list, a color list widely popular in France.

Iridescent electric blue

This shade of electric blue reflects the kind which is only metaphorically "electric". Its iridescence is also metaphoric.

Medium electric blue

The color displayed at right, titled medium electric blue, is the electric blue which "had an immense vogue in the latter 19th century". Its source is a textile sample from the 1890s.

Today, this tone remains typical of "electric blue" fabrics in the mass market.

Dark electric blue

Dark electric blue is a dark cyan color that is the color called electric blue, formalized as a color in the ISCC–NBS system in 1955.

The normalized color coordinates for dark electric blue are identical to Payne's grey, which was first recorded as a color name in English in 1835.

In nature

Crustaceans
The electric blue crayfish is a species of freshwater crayfish endemic to Florida.

Reptiles 
The electric blue gecko was first discovered by biologist William in the 1950s.

In the arts

Literature 
Miss. Hunter, in the Sherlock Holmes story “The Adventure of the Copper Beeches”, was required to wear an electric blue dress. It first published in the UK in The Strand Magazine, in June 1892.

Comics 
In a 1998 retelling of the original 1963 story of Superman Red/Superman Blue, Superman is temporarily deprived of the solar energy which his body needs. To compensate, he harnesses electricity. This eventually forces him to adopt a blue and white suit to prevent the energy from dispersing. He retained most of his abilities but lost his heat-vision and used electric attacks instead. Some fans refer to this version of Superman as "Electric Blue Superman".

Music 
David Bowie's song "Sound and Vision" references the color in the third verse,
   Blue, blue, electric blue
   That's the color of my room
   Where I will live
   Blue, blueThe new wave band Icehouse had a hit single in 1987 titled Electric Blue.

Other uses 
The color electric blue is associated with the astrological sign of Aquarius.

See also
 List of colors
 Electric indigo

References

Electric blue (color)
Electric blue (color)